Helmut Hofmann (14 November 1925 – 21 August 2017) was a German boxer. He competed in the men's flyweight event at the 1952 Summer Olympics, representing Saar.

References

External links
 

1925 births
2017 deaths
German male boxers
Olympic boxers of Saar
Boxers at the 1952 Summer Olympics
People from Friedrichsthal
Flyweight boxers
Sportspeople from Saarland